In numerical analysis, fixed-point iteration is a method of computing fixed points of a function.

which gives rise to the sequence  of iterated function applications  which is hoped to converge to a point .

More generally, the function  can be defined on any metric space with values in that same space.

Examples

This is a special case of Newton's method quoted below.
 The fixed-point iteration  converges to the unique fixed point of the function  for any starting point  This example does satisfy (at the latest after the first iteration step) the assumptions of the Banach fixed-point theorem. The Banach fixed-point theorem allows one to obtain fixed-point iterations with linear convergence.
 The requirement that  is continuous is important, as the following example shows.

Attracting fixed points

The natural cosine function ("natural" means in radians, not degrees or other units) has exactly one fixed point, and that fixed point is attracting. In this case, "close enough" is not a stringent criterion at all—to demonstrate this, start with any real number and repeatedly press the cos key on a calculator (checking first that the calculator is in "radians" mode). It eventually converges to the Dottie number (about 0.739085133), which is a fixed point. That is where the graph of the cosine function intersects the line .

Not all fixed points are attracting. For example, 0 is a fixed point of the function , but iteration of this function for any value other than zero rapidly diverges.

An attracting fixed point is said to be a stable fixed point if it is also Lyapunov stable.

A fixed point is said to be a neutrally stable fixed point if it is Lyapunov stable but not attracting. The center of a linear homogeneous differential equation of the second order is an example of a neutrally stable fixed point.

Multiple attracting points can be collected in an attracting fixed set.

Banach fixed-point theorem

The Banach fixed-point theorem gives a sufficient condition for the existence of attracting fixed points. A contraction mapping function  defined on a complete metric space has precisely one fixed point, and the fixed-point iteration is attracted towards that fixed point for any initial guess  in the domain of the function.

Although there are other fixed-point theorems, this one in particular is very useful because not all fixed-points are attractive. When constructing a fixed-point iteration, it is very important to make sure it converges to the fixed point. We can usually use the Banach fixed-point theorem to show that the fixed point is attractive.

Attractors 

Attracting fixed points are a special case of a wider mathematical concept of attractors. Fixed-point iterations are a discrete dynamical system on one variable. Bifurcation theory studies dynamical systems and classifies various behaviors such as attracting fixed points, periodic orbits, or strange attractors. An example system is the logistic map.

Iterative methods 

In computational mathematics, an iterative method is a mathematical procedure that uses an initial value to generate a sequence of improving approximate solutions for a class of problems, in which the n-th approximation is derived from the previous ones. Convergent fixed-point iterations are mathematically rigorous formalizations of iterative methods.

Iterative method examples

Convergence acceleration
The speed of convergence of the iteration sequence can be increased by using a convergence acceleration method such as Anderson acceleration and Aitken's delta-squared process. The application of Aitken's method to fixed-point iteration is known as Steffensen's method, and it can be shown that Steffensen's method yields a rate of convergence that is at least quadratic.

Chaos game 

The term chaos game refers to a method of generating the fixed point of any iterated function system (IFS). Hence the chaos game is a randomized fixed-point iteration. The chaos game allows plotting the general shape of a fractal such as the Sierpinski triangle by repeating the iterative process a large number of times. More mathematically, the iterations converge to the fixed point of the IFS. Whenever  belongs to the attractor of the IFS, all iterations  stay inside the attractor and, with probability 1, form a dense set in the latter.

See also

 Fixed-point combinator
 Cobweb plot
 Markov chain
 Infinite compositions of analytic functions
 Rate of convergence

References

Further reading

External links
Fixed-point algorithms online
Fixed-point iteration online calculator (Mathematical Assistant on Web)

Root-finding algorithms
Iterative methods